Swander is an unincorporated community in Seneca County, in the U.S. state of Ohio.

History
The post office Swander once had was called Morris. The Morris post office was established in 1874, and discontinued in 1903. Swander was the name of a prominent local family.

References

Unincorporated communities in Seneca County, Ohio
Unincorporated communities in Ohio